Tha Absolute Truth is an album by Dallas rapper Big Tuck, and his major-label debut.

Track listing
 "Monsta" 
 "Welcome to Dallas" 
 "In da Hood" (featuring Fat B & Tum Tum) 
 "We the Truth" 
 "I Know U Want That" (featuring Chamillionaire and Tum Tum) 
 "That What's Up" (featuring Dre) 
 "Bottom Bitch" (featuring Sleepy Lee) 
 "Texas Takeova" (featuring Bun B) 
 "Tussle" (featuring Tum Tum and Slim Thug) 
 "U Can't See Me" (featuring Double T. and Lil' Ronnie) 
 "Ain't No Mistaken (Danger Part II)" (featuring Erykah Badu) 
 "Stop at the Light" 
 "I'm a Ridah" 
 "Dippin in da Lac" (featuring Paul Wall) 
 "Meet Me on the Floor" (featuring Addiction and Tite) 
 "Rush"

Chart positions

References

2006 debut albums
Southern hip hop albums
Universal Records albums